The 1989 All-Ireland Senior Camogie Championship Final was the 58th All-Ireland Final and the deciding match of the 1989 All-Ireland Senior Camogie Championship, an inter-county camogie tournament for the top teams in Ireland.

Dublin had an easy eight point win, Angela Downey scoring 2-1 (losing her skirt while scoring one goal).

References

All-Ireland Senior Camogie Championship Finals
All-Ireland Senior Camogie Championship Final
All-Ireland Senior Camogie Championship Final
All-Ireland Senior Camogie Championship Final, 1989